Body Love Vol. 2 is the ninth album by Klaus Schulze. It was originally released in December 1977, and in 2007 was the twenty-eighth Schulze album reissued by Revisited Records. It consists of additions to the original soundtrack of February 1977 for the porn movie of the same name by Lasse Braun. Although generally described with the suffix Vol.2, the album's cover is printed Body Love only and its disk label states Body Love - Additions to the Original Soundtrack. The booklet for the 2007 reissue however maintains the correct title of this album is Body Love 2.

Track listing
All tracks composed by Klaus Schulze.

Personnel 
 Klaus Schulze – electronics
 Harald Grosskopf – drum set

External links
 Body Love Vol. 2 at the official site of Klaus Schulze
 

Klaus Schulze albums
1977 albums